Sean, Shaun or Shawn Spencer may refer to:

Sean Spencer (baseball) (born 1975), American baseball reliever
Sean Spencer (fighter) (born 1987), American mixed martial artist
Sean Spencer (Emmerdale), a fictional character from Emmerdale
Sean Spencer (American football) (born 1970), American football coach and former player
Shawn Spencer, a fictional character from Psych

See also
Sean
Sean Spence (born 1990), American football linebacker
Shaun Spence (born 1991), Australian rugby footballer